The Summoning is the debut album by the rock band Glamour of the Kill, released on 24 January 2011. The album was released via Afflicted Music.

On 13 November 2010, the band launched the video for "Feeling Alive", and soon after this video was launched on Kerrang! as "Video of the Week".

The UK magazine Metal Hammer, scored the album 7/10.

Track listing

Critical reception

The Summoning was generally well received by critics. Rob Kimber, writing for Punktastic, claimed that there were some "real gems" on the album, adding, "The Summoning offers a polished metal record that boasts both strong musicianship & a barrage of painfully catchy vocal hooks." Despite feeling that "there are a couple of songs that blur into the background", he praised the work of the band. Another reviewer, Pete Withers of Rock Sound, gave the album 7 out of 10, commenting: "...the band’s only formula here seems to be that if it sounds good, it’s going on."

Personnel
Davey Richmond – lead vocals, bass guitar
Mike Kingswood – guitars, backing vocals
Ben Thomson – drums, backing vocals
Chris Gomerson – guitars, backing vocals

References

2011 albums
Glamour of the Kill albums